Casnel Bushay (born 15 November 1985) is a sprinter from Saint Vincent and the Grenadines.

Bushay was born in Kingstown. He competed at the 2004 CARIFTA Games in Hamilton. In the boys under 20s age group, he ran 11.43 seconds in the 100 metres, finishing fourth in his heat and failing to advance to the final. In the 200 metres, he finished eighth in a time of 22.11 seconds. In that race, he finished behind a young Usain Bolt who won with a time of 19.93 seconds, setting a new junior world record.

Bushay competed at the 2006 IAAF World Indoor Championships in Moscow for his native Saint Vincent and the Grenadines. On 10 March he ran a personal best time of 6.84 seconds in the 60 metres, finishing seventh in his heat and 35th overall.

Nine days later he competed at the 2006 Commonwealth Games in Melbourne. In the 100 metres he placed 30th after the second round, failing to advance to the semi finals. He was also due to compete in the 200 metres, however he pulled out before his heat was run.

References

External links
 
 2004 CARIFTA Games – Under 20s Boys 200 metres

1985 births
Living people
Saint Vincent and the Grenadines male sprinters
Commonwealth Games competitors for Saint Vincent and the Grenadines
Athletes (track and field) at the 2006 Commonwealth Games